Ust-Pizya is a rural locality (a settlement) in Yugo-Kamskoye Rural Settlement, Permsky District, Perm Krai, Russia. The population was 266 as of 2010. There are 11 streets.

Geography 
Ust-Pizya is located 84 km southwest of Perm (the district's administrative centre) by road. Shondikha is the nearest rural locality.

References 

Rural localities in Permsky District